This is a list of ancient cities, towns, villages, and fortresses in and around Thrace and Dacia. A number of these settlements were Dacian and Thracian, but some were Celtic, Greek, Roman, Paeonian, or Persian.

A number of cities in Dacia and Thrace were built on or close to the sites of preexisting Dacian or Thracian settlements. Some settlements in this list may have a double entry, such as the Paeonian Astibo and Latin Astibus. It is believed that Thracians did not build true cities even if they were named as such; the largest Thracian settlements were large villages. The only known attempt to build a polis by the Thracians was Seuthopolis., although Strabo considered the Thracian cities with "bria" ending polises. Some of the Dacian settlements and fortresses employed the traditional Murus Dacicus construction technique.

Note: Throughout these lists, an asterisk [*] indicates that the toponym is reconstructed.

Daco-Thracian

Many city names were composed of an initial lexical element affixed to -dava, -daua, -deva, -deba, -daba, or -dova, which meant "city" or "town"   Endings on more southern regions are exclusively -bria ("town, city"), -disza, -diza, -dizos ("fortress, walled settlement"), -para, -paron, -pera, -phara ("town, village"). Strabo translated -bria as polis, but that may not be accurate. Thracian -disza, -diza, and -dizos are derived from Proto-Indo-European *dheigh-, "to knead clay", hence to "make bricks", "build walls", "wall", "walls", and so on. These Thracian lexical items show a satemization of PIE *gh-. Cognates include Ancient Greek teichos ("wall, fort, fortified town", as in the town of Didymoteicho) and Avestan da?za ("wall").

It is suggested that the "dava" endings are from the Dacian language, while the rest from the Thracian language. However "dava" towns can be found as south as Sandanski and Plovdiv. Some "dava" toponyms contain the same linguistic features as "diza" toponyms, e.g. Pirodiza and Pirodava. The first written mention of the name "Dacians" is in Roman sources. Strabo specified that the Daci are the Getae, identified as a Thracian tribe.  The Dacians, Getae and their kings were always considered as Thracians by the ancients (Dio Cassius, Trogus Pompeius, Appian, Strabo, Herodotus and Pliny the Elder) and were said to speak the same language. The Dacian language is considered a variety of the Thracian language. Such lexical differentiation -dava vs. para, would be hardly enough evidence to separate Dacian from Thracian, thus they are classified as dialects. It is also possible that '-dava' and '-bria' mean two different things in the same language, rather than meaning the same thing in two different languages. Thus bria could have been used for urbanized settlements, similar in scale and design to those of the "civilised" peoples like Greeks and Romans, whereas '-dava' could mean a settlement which is rural, being situated in the steppe-like part of the Thracian lands.

 Abydos
 Acidava (Acidaua), a fortress town close to the Danube, located in today's Piatra-Olt, Olt County, Romania
 Acmonia
 Abdera
 Acatapara
 Aedava (Aedeva, Aedabe, Aedeba or Aedadeba), placed by Procopius on the Danubian road between Augustae and Variana, in Moesia (the present Northern Bulgaria)
 Aedeva, modern Pernik
 Agatapara
 Ahypara
 Aiadava (Aiadaba or Aeadaba), a locality in the Remesiana region in present-day Bela Palanka, Serbia
 Aizis
 Alaaibria (Aixis, Aixim, Airzis, Azizis, Azisis, Aizisis, Alzisis, Aigis, Aigizidava*, Zizis), mentioned by Emperor Trajan in Dacica
 Amutria (Amutrion, Amutrium), a Dacian town close to the Danube, possibly today's Motru, Gorj County, Romania 
 Apulon (Apoulon, Apula), a fortress city close to modern Alba-Iulia, Romania from which the Latin name of Apulum is derived
 Arcina (Arcinna), a fortress town in Wallachia
 Apsynthus
 Arcobadara 
 Argedava (Argedauon, Sargedava, Sargedauon, Zargedava, Zargedauon), mentioned in the Decree of Dionysopolis, potentially the dava discovered at Popești, a district in the town of Mihăilești, Giurgiu County, Romania and maybe Burebista's court or capital
 Argidava (Argidaua, Arcidava, Arcidaua, Argedava, Argedauon, Sargedava, Sargedauon, Zargedava, Zargedauon), potentially Burebista's court or capital, located in today's Vărădia, Caraș-Severin County, Romania
 Artanes, modern Lom
 Arutela
 Apulon
 Atipara
 Authiparu
 Bergula
 Berzobis, ancient Bârzava, Romania
 Bataldeua
 Bazopara
 Bediza
 Belaidipara
 Bendipara
 Beodiza
 Bergula, modern (Luleburgaz)
 Beripara
 Beroea, modern Stara Zagora
 Bessapara of the Bessi tribe, today Sinitovo
 Bizye, capital of the Odrysae
 Bolbabria
 Bortudiza
 Bospara
 Bregedava
 Breierphara, near modern Komotini
 Brentopara
 Briparon
 Buatpara
 Buricodava
 Buridava  (Burridava), today's Ocnele Mari, Romania
 Burtudiza
 Busipara
 Buteridava 
 Cabassus
 Capidava (Kapidaua), a fortress town on the southern side of the lower Danube
 Caria, modern Shabla
 Carsidava or Karsidaua
 Cedonia, near Sibiu
 Chesdupara
 Cleipadava
 Crenides
 Cumidava  (Comidava, Komidaua), ancient Râșnov, Romania
 Cumlideva
 Cypasis
 Danedebai, 
 Dausdava (Dausadava, Dausdavua), "The shrine of wolves", a fortress town close to the Danube
 Debelt
 Dentheletica, capital of the Dentheletae tribe, modern Kyustendil
 Desudaba or Maedius of the Maedi tribe, modern Sandanski
 Diacum 
 Dierna
 Dinogetia,  located above the Danube delta
 Docidava or Dokidaua
 Dodopara
 Drabeskos
 Drobeta,  located on the left bank of the Danube at Turnu Severin
 Drusipara
 Egeta 
 Ergines
 Eumolpias, later Pulpudeva translating Philippopolis, the name resulted in modern Plovdiv, prehistoric settlement
 Gatae
 Gazoros
 Gellipara
 Genucla,  settlement located south of the Danube
 Germania, "hot water", modern Sapareva Banya, site of the Dentheletae tribe
 Germisara "hot water"
 Gildova (Gildoba), located along the Vistula river
 Giridava
 Hesdupara
 Iamphorynna, capital of the Maedi tribe
 Itadeba (Itadava)
 Isgipara
 Ismara
 Istria (Olbia)
 Jidava, near Câmpulung Muscel, Romania
 Jidova
 Kabyle of the Kabileti tribe, capital of the Odrysae
 Keliadeva
 Keirpara
 Keriparon
 Kipsela, modern Ipsala
 Kirpiza
 Kistidiza
 Klepidaua
 Krabnopara
 Krasalopara
 Kuimedaba
 Longinopara
 Lygos, modern Istanbul
 Malva, a Dacian settlement where Roman Romula was built
 Marcodava (Dacia) (Markodaua)
 Maskiobria
 Melsambria, modern Nessebar
 Melta, modern Lovech
 Murideba
 Mutzipara* Napoca, ancient Cluj-Napoca, Romania
 Naulochas, modern Obzor
 Nentinava (Netindaua), ancient Slobozia, Romania
 Nentivava, ancient Olteniţa, Romania
 Netindava
 Nipsa near Panisus
 Oescus of the Triballi tribe
 Odryssa or Uscudama, modern Edirne, capital of the Odrysae or Bessi tribe
 Onokarsis, capital residence of the Odrysae, possibly modern Starosel
 Orsudisza
 Ostudiza
 Patridava (Patridaua)
 Patruissa
 Pelendava (Pelendova), ancient Craiova, Romania
 Perburidava
 Perperikon
 Pinon
 Piroboridava
 Petra, fort of Maedi
 Petrodava (Petrodaua), located in Piatra Neamț
 Piroboridava (Piroboridaua)
 Pizos
 Polondava
 Polymbria
 Potaissa (Patavissa), ancient Turda, Romania
 Predava
 Priskupera
 Quemedava, mentioned by Procopius in Dardania
 Ramidava (Rhamidaua)
 Ratiaria
 Recidava
 Remesiana
 Romboses
 Rusidava (Rusidava)
 Ruconium
 Sacidava (Sacidaba)
 Sagadava
 Salmydessos, modern Kıyıköy, residence of the Odrysae
 Sandava
 Sangidaua
 Sarmizegetusa (Sarmisegetuza), Decebalus's capital and holy place
 Scaidava (Skedeba)
 Scaptopara, of the Dentheletae tribe, modern Blagoevgrad
 Scaripara
 Scedabria
 Scelabria
 Scept
 Selymbria, modern Silivri in European Turkey
 Serdica of the Serdi tribe, modern Sofia
 Setidava (Setidaua), mentioned by Ptolemy as a thriving settlement
 Seuthopolis
 Singidava (Singidaua)
 Sintica of the Sintoi tribe
 Skaripara
 Skaskopara
 Spinopara
 Stratopara
 Strupil
 Subzupara
 Sucidava (Suvidava, Sukidaua), located in Corabia, Olt County, Romania
 Susudava, mentioned by Ptolemy as a thriving settlement
 Sykidaba
 Tamasidava (Tamasidaua)
 Tarpodiza
 Tapae, a Dacian outpost guarding Sarmisegetuza and the site of two major battles between Dacians and Romans
 Teichos, residence of the Odryssae
 Therma of the Mygdones tribe, modern Thessaloniki
Thermidava, placed by Ptolemy on the Lissus-Naissus route. The toponym is most probably a misreading of a settlement which most scholars in contemporary research locate near present-day Banat, Serbia.
 Thynia, town of the Thyni
 Tibiscum
 Tirista (Tsirista)
 Tranopara
 Tranupara
 Tsgipera
 Tsierna (Dierna)
 Tyrida
 Tyrodiza
 Urdoviza, modern Kiten
 Utidava (Utidaua)
 Zalcdaba
 Zaldapa
 Zargidava (Zargidaua)
 Zburulus
 Sarmicegetusa
 Zeugma
 Zesutera
 Zidava
 Zikideva
 Zimnicea, site where Alexander the Great fought the Dacians
 Ziridava (Ziridaua), identified archaeologically with Pecica, Arad, Romania 
 Zirmai
 Zisnudeba
 Zisnedeva (Zisnudeva, Zisnudeba), located in Dacian Moesia
 Zucidaua
 Zurobara
 Zusidava

Unknown names

 Aghireșu
 Ardan
 Ardeu
 Arpașu de Sus
 Augustin
 Băile Tușnad
 Băleni-Români
 Bănița
 Bâzdâna
 Beidaud
 Bocșa
 Boroșneu Mic
 Boșorod
 Botfei
 Breaza
 Bretea Mureșană
 Bucium
 Căpâlna
 Cernat
 Cetățeni
 Cioclovina
 Clopotiva
 "Costești-Blidaru"
 "Costești-Cetățuie"
 Cotnari
 Coțofenii din Dos
 Covasna
 Cozia
 Crăsanii de Jos
 Crivești
 Crizbav
 Cuciulata
 "Cucuiș - Dealul Golu"
 "Cucuiș - Vârful Berianului"
 Cugir
 Cârlomănești
 Dalboșeț
 Densuș
 Divici
 Drajna de Sus
 Dumitrița
 Eliseni
 Feldioara
 "Fețele Albe"
 Grădiștea de Munte
 Iedera de Jos
 Feleac
 Jigodin
 Liubcova
 Mala Kopania
 Marca
 Mataraua
 Merești
 Moinești
 Monariu
 Monor
 Moșna
 Ocolișu Mic
 Odorheiu Secuiesc
 Olteni
 Orăștie Mountains
 Petrila
 Petroșani
 "Piatra Roșie"
 Pietroasa Mică
 Pinticu
 Pisculești
 Poiana cu Cetate
 Polovragi
 Ponor
 Popești (Călărași)
 Porumbenii Mari
 Praid
 Racoș
 Racu
 Radovanu - Gorgana I
 Radovanu - Jidovescu
 Roadeș
 Rovinari
 Rușor
 Sacalasău
 Satu Mare (Harghita)
 Satu Nou
 Sânzieni
 Seimeni
 Socol
 Sprâncenata
 Stâncești
 Stoina
 Șeica Mică
 Tășad
 Telița
 Teliu
 Tilișca
 Timișu de Jos
 Turia
 Unip
 Uroi
 Valea Seacă
 Viișoara Moșneni
 Zemplín
 Zetea

Thraco-Illyrian
 Chesdupara
 Daradapara
 Scupi of the Dardani tribe
 Sirmium

Greek and Macedon

Thrace, from Strymon to Nestos
 Amphipolis, founded by colonists from Athens
 Akontisma
 Antisara
 Creston, modern Kilkis
 Datos, founded by colonists from Thasos
 Drabeskos
 Eion, founded by colonists from Athens
 Ennea Hodoi
 Galepsus, founded by colonists from Thasos
 Gasoros
 Heraclea Sintica
 Krenides, founded by colonists from Thasos
 Mastira, mentioned by Demosthenes (341 BCE) in his "The Oration on the State of the Chersonesus". This town was unknown to the scholar Harpocration (100-200 CE), who suggests that instead of "Mastira" we should read "Bastira", a known Thracian town of that name. 
 Myrkinos, founded by colonists from Miletus in 497 BC
 Neapolis, founded by colonists from Thasos, modern Kavala
 Oesyme, founded by colonists from Thasos
 Paroikopolis
 Pergamos
 Phagres, founded by colonists from Thasos
 Philippi, founded by Philip II of Macedon, rebuilt Crenides
 Philippopolis (modern Plovdiv)
 Pistyros, founded by colonists from Thasos
 Sirra, founded by Philip II of Macedon, rebuilt town of the Siriopeoni, modern Serres
 Skapte Hyle
 Skotoussa
 Tristolos

Thrace, from Nestos to Hebros
 Abdera, founded by colonists from Klazomenai
 Ainos (Poltymbria) founded by colonists from Alopeke, Mytilene, and Kyme
 Bergepolis, founded by colonists from Abdera
 Doriskos
 Drys, founded by colonists from Samothrace
 Dikaia, founded by colonists from Samos
 Kypsela
 Larissa
 Maroneia, founded by colonists from Chios
 Menebria, founded by colonists from Samothrace on a town named Melsambria, modern Nessebar
 Orthagoria
 Sale, founded by colonists from Samothrace
 Stryme, founded from colonists from Thasos
 Zone, founded by colonists from Samothrace

Inland Thrace
 Alexandropolis Maedica
 Beroea, founded by Philip II of Macedon in 342 BC
 Philippopolis| Pulpudeva (Philippopolis), today's city of Plovdiv in Bulgaria, founded by Philip II of Macedon in a town formerly called Eumolpias.
 Stanimachos, founded by colonists from Istiaia, modern Asenovgrad
 Pistiros, founded by Pistyrians from the coast

Thracian Chersonesos
Aegospotami (Aegospotamos)
 Alokopennesos, founded by colonists from Aeolis
 Araplos
 Callipolis
 Chersonesos (Agora), founded by colonists from Athens
 Derris
 Elaious, founded by colonists from Athens
 Ide
 Kardia, founded by colonists from Athens
 Kressa
 Krithotai, founded by colonists from Athens
 Limnae, founded by colonists from Miletus
 Madytos, founded by colonists from Lesbos
 Pactya, founded by colonists from Athens
 Paion
 Sestos, founded by colonists from Lesbos

Propontic Thrace
 Athyra
 Byzantion, founded by colonists from Megara on a town called Lygos, modern Istanbul
 Bisanthe, founded by colonists from Samos
 Daminon Teichos
 Ergiske
 Heraclea (Perinthus)
 Heraion, founded by colonists from Samos
 Lysimachia
 Neapolis (Thracian Chersonese), founded by colonists from Athens
 Orestias, rebuilt
 Perinthus, founded by colonists from Samos
 Rhaedestus, founded by colonists from Samos
 Serrion Teichos
 Selymbria, modern Silivri in European Turkey, of Thracian etymology
 Tyrodiza, of Thracian etymology

West Pontic coast
 Aegyssos, modern Tulcea
 Aquae Calidae
 Ahtopol, founded by colonists from Athens
 Anchialos, modern Pomorie, founded by colonists from Appolonia
 Apollonia, modern Sozopol, founded by Ionians
 Berga, founded by colonists from Thasos
 Bizone, founded by colonists from Miletus, modern Kavarna
 Krutoi, modern Balchik founded by Miletian colonists
 Dionysopolis, modern Balchik, founded by colonists from Miletus
 Heliopolis, modern Obzor
 Histria, founded by colonists from Miletus
 Kallatis (Callatis), founded from colonists from Herakleia Pontike, modern-day Mangalia, Romania
 Mesembria, modern Nesebar, settled during the 6th century BC by Dorians from Megara
 Odessos, modern Varna, founded by colonists from Miletus
 Nikonion, founded by colonists from Istros
 Salmydessos (from IE *salm-udes, "salty water"; cf. Greek álmē, "sea water, brine"; ýdos, "water")
 Tomis, modern Constanta, rebuilt Scythian town

Other
 Aison
 Brea, founded by colonists from Athens,
 Gazoros
 Heraclea Sintica on a tribe of the Sintoi tribe
 Kossaia

Persian
 Boryza (city)
 Doriscus

Roman

 Abritus
 Acumincum
 Ad Medium
 Agura Piatra (Regianum)
 Appiaria
 Apros
 Aquis
 Augustae
 Augusta Traiana (formerly Beroe, later Stara Zagora)
 Burgenae
 Camistrum
 Caenophrurium
 Cypsella
 Deultum, rebuilt Debelt
 Deltum
 Diocletianopolis (modern Hisarya)
 Doracium
 Durorstorum, modern Silistra
 Drobeta
 Gensis
 Hadrianople, rebuild Uscudama
 Justiniana Prima
 Margus
 Marcianopolis, modern Devnya
 Maximianopolis
 Morisena
 Montana
 Nicopolis ad Istrum
 Nicopolis ad Nestum, rebuilt Alexandrupolis
 Novae
 Oescus
 Pautalia, modern Kyustendil
 Pescium, modern Peć
 Plotinopolis, modern Hissarya,
 Porolissum
 Resculum (castra Remesiana)
 Sexagnita Prista, modern Ruse
 Sirmium
 Theranda
 Traianopolis
 Transmarisca, modern Tutrakan
 Tropaeum Traiani
 Turres, modern Pirot
 Ulmetum
 Ulpiana
 Ulpia Traiana Sarmizegetusa
 Valve, modern Vratsa
 Vicianum, modern Vučitrn
 Viminacium
 Zaldapa
 Zikideva
 the rest after conquest

Celtic
 Dunonia, modern Vidin
 Malata
 Naissus, modern Niš
 Noviodunum
 Serdica, modern Sofia
 Singidunum, modern Belgrade
 Taurunum
 Tylis

See also

 List of ancient tribes in Thrace and Dacia
 List of rulers of Thrace and Dacia
 List of ancient cities in Illyria
 List of rulers of Illyria
 Dacian Dava
 Dacian Fortresses of the Orăştie Mountains
 Tabula Peutingeriana
 Notitia Dignitatum

Notes

References

External links

 
 Sorin Olteanu's Project: Linguae Thraco-Daco-Moesorum - Toponyms Section
 Duridanov's paper on Thracian toponyms
 Placenames in the Compilation 'notitia dignitatum' (Cnd)
 Lists of Dacian fortresses, towns and citadels 
 Dacia
 Dacian Map
 Thracians and Dacians
 Thracians 700-46 BC 

Geography of ancient Thrace
 
Ancient Thrace
Celtic towns
Thracian towns
Greek colonies in Thrace
Greek colonization
Former populated places in the Balkans
Archaeological sites in Romania
Balkans-related lists